Yes, Lord! is the hymnal used by the Church of God in Christ. It was published in 1985 by the COGIC Publishing Board under the leadership of  a on Bishop J.O. Patterson, Sr.

List of Hymns 

 The Yes Lord Praise
 A Mighty Fortress Is Our God
 Amazing Grace
 Are You Washed in The Blood (written by Elisha Hoffman)
 Glory to his Name
 Old Rugged Cross
 My Savior Didst Die, but He Rose Up Again
 I'm Saved By his Power Divine
 Jesus keep me near the cross
 Glory, Glory, Hallelujah
 O Beautiful
 The Star-Spangled Banner
 God's Not Dead, He's Yet Alive
 Hark! The Herald Angels Sing
 Silent Night
 Joy to the World
 We Three Kings of Orient Are
 The First Noel
 O Little Town of Bethlehem
 O Come All Ye Faithful
 He Arose
 The Hallelujah Chorus
 What a mighty God we serve
 Jesus is Able to save a poor sinner
 My God is Able
 Praise Him
 Holy, Holy, Holy, Lord God Almighty
 He's a wonderful God
 Jesus the solid Rock
 The Blood Prevails
 There is a fountain filled with blood
 I know it was Jesus' blood that saved me
 Nobody Like You, Jesus
 Near the Cross
 Praise God, Praise Jesus, and Praise the Holy Ghost
 'Tis so sweet
 Yield Not to Temptation
 My Soul Loves Jesus
 Jesus loves me
 Holy Ghost overshadow me
 How great is our God
 God of our Fathers
 Hallelujah, 'Tis Done
 Nothin' But The Blood Of Jesus
 Victory in Jesus
 I found Jesus and I'm glad
 God is My Everything

See also
List of English-language hymnals by denomination

External links 
 Church of God in Christ

Hymnals
1985 books
1985 in Christianity
1985 in music